The Chichester by-election of 22 May 1969 was held following the death of Conservative Member of Parliament (MP) Walter Loveys. The seat was retained for the Conservatives by Christopher Chataway, who had previously been MP for Lewisham North from 1959 to 1966.

Results

References

1969 elections in the United Kingdom
1969 in England
20th century in Sussex
Chichester District
By-elections to the Parliament of the United Kingdom in West Sussex constituencies
Chichester